Wild Sweet Orange was an American indie rock band from Homewood, Alabama. In early 2008 their song "Land of No Return" was featured on Grey's Anatomy. The band performed the song "Ten Dead Dogs" live on the Late Show with David Letterman on June 23, 2008. Their first full LP, We Have Cause to Be Uneasy, was released on July 29, 2008.  Wild Sweet Orange has opened for bands such as Counting Crows, Guster, Augustana, and Gringo Star.

On September 7, 2010, the band announced on their Facebook page that they were calling it quits.

Vocalist Preston Lovinggood continued with other projects, including a successfully funded Kickstarter campaign which ended in 2017.

On August 28, 2017, the band's Facebook page announced that "something is brewing".

The band released the single Plans in 2022.

Discography

EPs
2007: House of Regret EP
2007: The Whale EP (Nervous Blood/TAO)

Albums
2008: We Have Cause to Be Uneasy (Canvasback Music)

References

Indie rock musical groups from Alabama